CBS Children's Film Festival (also known as CBS Children's Hour) is a 1967-1984 television series of live action films from several countries that were made for children (several of them dubbed into English).  Originally a sporadic series airing on Saturday mornings, Sunday afternoons, or weekday afternoons beginning in February 1967, it became a regularly scheduled program in 1971 on the CBS Saturday-morning lineup, running one hour with some films apparently edited down to fit the time slot. The program was hosted by 1950s television act Kukla, Fran and Ollie, a.k.a. puppeteer Burr Tillstrom and actress Fran Allison.

Kukla, Fran and Ollie were dropped from the series in 1977 and the program was renamed CBS Saturday Film Festival. In 1978 CBS canceled the show in favor of the youth-targeted magazine 30 Minutes which was modeled after its adult sister show 60 Minutes. CBS canceled 30 Minutes in 1982 and brought back Saturday Film Festival which ran for two seasons until CBS cancelled it for good in 1984.

Perhaps the most famous "episode" of the series was the 1960 British film Hand in Hand, the story of a deep friendship between two elementary school students, one a Roman Catholic boy and the other a Jewish girl.

In addition to many American and British films, the series also featured motion pictures from Russia, France, Bulgaria, Japan, Sweden, Italy, China, Australia, South Africa, and Czechoslovakia, as well as several other countries.

Other films that aired during the series run include the Academy Award-winning French film The Red Balloon; Skinny and Fatty from Japan; Digby, the Biggest Dog in the World from Great Britain; Tillie, the Unhappy Hippopotamus from Czechoslovakia; and Mi-Mi, the Lazy Kitten from China.

Actor Ray Bolger, a star of The Wizard of Oz, served as narrator for some of the episodes during the show's 1980s run.

Films
Following is a partial list of films aired on the program:

Adventure in Golden Bay - Czech, 1956
Adventure in the Hopfields - British, 1954
Angel and Big Joe - American, 1975
Anoop and the Elephant - British, 1972
Bag on Bag - Soviet, 1974
A Bird of Africa - Japanese, 1975
Birds Come Flying To Us - Bulgarian, 1971
Black Mountain - Soviet, 1970
The Blind Bird - Soviet, 1963
The Boy and the Airplane - French, 1965
The Boy Who Owned a Melephant - American, 1959
The Boy Who Wore Spectacles - Soviet, ?
The Boy With Glasses - Japanese, 1962
Bunnie - Polish, 1973
The Camerons - Australian, 1974
Captain Korda - Czech, 1970
Captain Mikula, the Kid - Yugoslavian, 1974
Carole, I Love You - French, 1971
Charlie the Rascal - Swedish, 1972
Chimpmates - British, 1976
The Chiffy Kids - British, 1976
Circus Adventure - Dutch, 1972
Circus Angel - French, 1965
Clown - Spanish, 1969
Cold Pizza - Canadian, 1972
Countdown to Danger - British, 1967
Cry Wolf - British, 1968
Danger Point - British, 1971
Death of a Gandy Dancer - Canadian, 1977
Digby, the Biggest Dog in the World - British, 1973
Doggie and Three - Czech, 1955
Egghead's Robot - British, 1970
Elephant River - Ceylon, 1956
Felipa: North of the Border - American, 1971
The Firefighters - British, 1975
Flash the Sheepdog - British, 1966
Fly Away Dove - American, 1982
The Flying Sorcerer - British, 1973
For Boys Only Is For Girls, Also - Czech, 1964
A Friend - Italian, 1967
Friend or Foe - British, 1969
Friends for Life - Soviet, 1971
Funny Stories - Soviet, 1962
Geronimo Jones - American, 1970
Get Used to Me - American, 1976
Ghost of a Chance - British, 1968
The Giant Eel - Czech, 1971
Glamador - French, 1955
The Goalkeeper Also Lives on Our Street - Czech, 1957
The Golden Fish - French, 1959
Gosha the Bear - Soviet, 1971
Hand in Hand - British, 1960
Headline Hunters - British, 1967
Heidi - German/Austrian, 1965
J.T. (1969)
Joey - American, 1978
John and Julie - British, 1954
The Johnstown Monster - British, 1971
Jumping Over Puddles - Czech, 1970
The Legend of John Henry - American, 1974
The Legend of Paul Bunyan - American, 1973
Lionheart - British, 1968
The Little Bearkeepers - Czech, 1957
The Little Ones - British, 1965
Little Pig - Hong Kong, 1976
The Little Wooden Horse - French, 1966
Lone Wolf - Yugoslavian, 1972
Lost in Pajamas - Czech, 1966
Lucy and the Miracles - Czech, 1970
The Magnificent 6-1/2 - British, 1967
Mauro the Gypsy - British, 1972
Me and You, Kangaroo - Australian, 1974
A Member of the Family - British, 1971
Miguel's Navidad - Mexico, 1976
Miguel: Up From Puerto Rico - American, 1970
Mischief - British, 1968
Mr. Horatio Knibbles - British, 1971
My Father, Sun-Sun Johnson - Jamaican, 1976
My Main Man - American, 1975
Nikkolina - Canadian, 1977
Nina and the Street Kids - Swedish, 1974
Nunu and the Zebra - South African, 1973
On Snow White - Czech, 1972
The Orange Watering Cart - Hungarian, ?1973
Paddle to the Sea - Canadian, 1966
Paganini Strikes Again - British, 1974
Pero and His Companions - Yugoslavia, 1970
The Promise - American, 1977
The Ransom of Red Chief - Soviet, 1963
The Red Balloon - French, 1956
Scramble - British, 1969
A Seafaring Dog - Soviet, 1973
The Secret - American, 1977
The Seven Ravens - German, 1937
Shok and Sher - Soviet, ?
Shopping Bag Lady - American, 1975
The Show Must Go On - Soviet, ?
Six Bears and a Clown - Czech, 1972
Sirius - Czech, 1974
Skinny and Fatty - Japanese, 1959
Soapbox Derby - Canadian, ?
Stowaway in the Sky - French, 1959
Strange Holiday - Australian, 1969
That's My Name, Don't Wear it Out - British, ?
Three Nuts for Cinderella - Czech, 1973
Thunderstorm - French, ?
Ticko - Swedish, ?
Tiko and the Shark - Italian/French, 1965
Tjorven, Batsman, and Moses - Swedish, 1964
Tony and the Tick-Tock Dragon - Hungarian, ?
Turniphead - Italian, 1965
Tymancha's Friend - Soviet, 1970
Up in the Air - British, 1969
The Violin - Canadian, 1974
What Next? - British, 1974
Where's Johnny? - British, 1974
White Mane - French, 1952
Winter of the Witch - British, 1969
The Yellow Slippers - Polish, 1961

References 
Informational notes

Citations

External links 
 
 CBS Children's Film Festival film listings

1960s American children's television series
1970s American children's television series
1980s American children's television series
1967 American television series debuts
1984 American television series endings
American television shows featuring puppetry
Television series by CBS Studios
CBS original programming
American motion picture television series